This is a list of reference works on documentary films.

Books

See also 
 Bibliography of film by genre

Bibliographies of film
Documentary film